Alismatidae is a botanical name at the rank of subclass.  Circumscription of the subclass will vary with the taxonomic system being used (there are many such systems); the only requirement being that it includes the family Alismataceae. It is a relatively new name: earlier systems, such as the Engler and Wettstein systems, used the name Helobiae for a comparable unit.

Alismatidae in the Takhtajan system
The Takhtajan system treats this as one of six subclasses within the class Liliopsida (=monocotyledons). It consists of:

 subclass Alismatidae
 superorder Alismatanae
 order Butomales
 order Hydrocharitales
 order Najadales
 order Alismatales
 order Aponogetonales
 order Juncaginales
 order Potamogetonales
 order Posidoniales
 order Cymodoceales
 order Zosterales

Alismatidae in the Cronquist system
The Cronquist system treats this as one of four subclasses within the class Liliopsida (=monocotyledons). It consists of (1981):

 subclass Alismatidae
 order Alismatales
 order Hydrocharitales
 order Najadales
 order Triuridales

This subclass comprises less than five hundred species total: many of these are aquatic or semiaquatic plants (see
Alismatidae info).

APG II system
The APG II system does not use formal botanical names above the rank of order; it assigns most of the plants involved to the (expanded) order Alismatales, in the clade 'monocots', although the plants in Cronquist's order  Triuridales are assigned to quite different placements.

Monocots